The Turkish Karting Championship was a kart racing series based in Turkey. It took place between 2001 and 2014 in four categories.

Champions

ICA/KF2/125cc Open/Formula Senior

ICA Junior/KF3/Formula Junior

Mini

Formula Master

References

External links 
 https://www.driverdb.com/championships/karting/

Kart racing series